NFL AM (also known as NFL All Morning) is an NFL morning television program on NFL Network. The program premiered on Monday, July 30, 2012. It aired from 6a to 10a ET. On May 8, 2015, the program went on hiatus. Network executives stated that they will perform performance reviews and planned to relaunch sometime during the 2015 NFL preseason. It was subsequently cancelled and replaced by NFL HQ, which was, in turn, replaced with Good Morning Football.

The program featured Rhett Lewis, Erin Coscarelli, LaVar Arrington, Eric Davis, Terrell Davis, Jordan Babineaux, Steve Wyche, Molly Qerim and Mark Kriegel.  In July 2014, Coscarelli and Lewis were added to the cast of co-hosts.

References

External links
NFL AM 

NFL Network original programming
National Football League television series
Television morning shows in the United States
2012 American television series debuts
2015 American television series endings
American sports television series
2010s American television talk shows
English-language television shows